The island Frauenchiemsee, often called Fraueninsel, is the second largest of the three islands in Chiemsee, Germany. It belongs to the municipality of Chiemsee in the Upper Bavarian district of Rosenheim, which is the smallest municipality in all of Bavaria. The  large and car-free Fraueninsel houses a convent of Benedictine nuns, which is usually called , as well as 300 permanent residents.

History 

The monastery was founded in 782 by Tassilo III, Duke of Bavaria, making Frauenwörth the eldest German speaking convent beyond the alps. It was called Schönau in the Notitia de servitio monasteriorum. In 850, Blessed Irmengard was the first known abbess. The minster is dedicated to the Purification of the Blessed Virgin Mary.

After the destruction of the Hungarian incursions, the monastery's heyday was between the 11th and 15th centuries. In 1254 the Bavarian dukes finally obtained the rights to Frauenwörth. As the remainder of the old imperial immediacy, the abbey retained the designation  ("Royal Monastery") until the secularization of 1803 and was reserved for the daughters of the nobility.

The monastery buildings were rebuilt between 1728 and 1732. In the course of the German Mediatisation the monastery was secularized between 1803 and 1835; only five nuns were allowed to stay due to their age. In 1837 King Ludwig I of Bavaria rebuilt the monastery for the Benedictine nuns and allowed them to receive new candidates on the condition that the nuns created their livelihood by opening schools. Henceforth, a grammar school, called Irmengard Gymnasium, existed on the site until 1995. Furthermore, the Benedictines ran a vocational school for nursery teachers, housekeepers et cetera. In 1901 the convent was declared an abbey again.  the monastery has 21 sisters, the abbess is Johanna Mayer OSB.

Tourism 
Frauenchiemsee along with its sister island Herreninsel is one of the main tourist attractions on the Chiemsee, and is famous for the monastery's liquor spirit, which is produced by the nuns. The island is accessible by ship year round, usually from Gstadt, Prien, and Seebruck. There are also several boats that can take passengers from Frauenchiemsee to Herreninsel and back.

As part of a family grave, a cenotaph to Alfred Jodl, army general and executed war criminal, was located on the island, but was removed in 2018 after a decision of the local council. His brother  Ferdinand Jodl is buried in the family grave.

References 

Lake islands of Germany
Islands of Bavaria
Imperial abbeys disestablished in 1802–03
782 establishments
8th-century establishments in Germany
Rosenheim (district)